Aleksandar Pešić (Serbian Cyrillic: Александар Пешић; born 21 May 1992) is a Serbian professional footballer who plays as a striker for Red Star Belgrade.

Club career

Europe 
Pešić made his senior debut with Radnički Niš on 24 May 2008, just three days after his 16th birthday. He came on as a late second-half substitute in a goalless draw with ČSK Čelarevo at home, thus breaking the record of Dejan Petković and becoming the youngest ever player in the club's history. However, the club suffered relegation from the Serbian First League at the end of the season after losing to Inđija in the playoffs.

In July 2008, Pešić moved abroad to Greece and signed for OFI Crete on a three-year deal. He made one appearance in the 2008–09 Superleague Greece, still aged 16, as the club suffered relegation from the top flight. In early 2011, Pešić joined the reigning Moldovan champions Sheriff Tiraspol. He helped them win back-to-back championship titles in 2012 and 2013. On 15 August 2013, Pešić left the club by mutual agreement.

On 30 August 2013, Pešić returned to his homeland and joined Jagodina. He netted a brace on his debut for the club on 14 September 2013, thus giving his side a 2–0 home league win over Spartak Subotica. On 4 December 2013, Pešić scored a hat-trick in a 4–1 Serbian Cup quarter-final victory over Donji Srem. He was the club's top scorer with 13 goals in the 2013–14 Serbian SuperLiga, being named in the competition's best eleven.

On 26 June 2015, Pešić officially signed a five-year contract with French club Toulouse. He scored six goals in Ligue 1 during his debut season, but only two in the next one. On 1 September 2016, it was announced that Pešić was transferred to Italian club Atalanta on a season-long loan.

On 4 July 2017, Pešić signed a three-year contract with Red Star Belgrade. He became the top goalscorer of the 2017–18 Serbian SuperLiga with 25 goals.

Asia 
In July 2018, Pešić signed a three-year contract with Saudi Arabia club Al-Ittihad.

On 8 February 2019, Pešić was loaned to FC Seoul on a one-and-a-half-year contract.

International career
Pešić has represented Serbia under-19 at the 2011 UEFA European Under-19 Championship, where the team were eliminated in the semi-finals against the Czech Republic. He was also a member of the Serbia under-21 team at the 2015 UEFA European Under-21 Championship, as they finished bottom of their group.

On 15 November 2016, Pešić made his full international debut for the senior team, playing in a second half in a 2–0 friendly defeat against Ukraine.

Career statistics

Club

International

Honours

Club
Sheriff Tiraspol
 Moldovan National Division (2): 2011–12, 2012–13
 Moldovan Super Cup: 2013

Red Star Belgrade
 Serbian SuperLiga: 2017–18

Individual
 Serbian SuperLiga Top Scorer: 2017–18
 Serbian SuperLiga Player of the Season: 2017–18
 Serbian SuperLiga Team of the Season: 2013–14, 2017–18

Notes

References

External links
 
 
 
 
 

1992 births
Living people
Sportspeople from Munich
Serbian footballers
Serbia youth international footballers
Serbia under-21 international footballers
Serbia international footballers
Association football forwards
FK Radnički Niš players
OFI Crete F.C. players
FC Sheriff Tiraspol players
FK Jagodina players
Toulouse FC players
Atalanta B.C. players
Red Star Belgrade footballers
Ittihad FC players
FC Seoul players
Maccabi Tel Aviv F.C. players
Fatih Karagümrük S.K. footballers
Serbian First League players
Serbian SuperLiga players
Super League Greece players
Football League (Greece) players
Moldovan Super Liga players
Ligue 1 players
Serie A players
Saudi Professional League players
K League 1 players
Israeli Premier League players
Süper Lig players
Serbian expatriate footballers
Expatriate footballers in Greece
Expatriate footballers in Moldova
Expatriate footballers in France
Expatriate footballers in Italy
Expatriate footballers in Saudi Arabia
Expatriate footballers in South Korea
Expatriate footballers in Israel
Expatriate footballers in Turkey
Serbian expatriate sportspeople in Greece
Serbian expatriate sportspeople in Moldova
Serbian expatriate sportspeople in France
Serbian expatriate sportspeople in Italy
Serbian expatriate sportspeople in Saudi Arabia
Serbian expatriate sportspeople in South Korea
Serbian expatriate sportspeople in Israel
Serbian expatriate sportspeople in Turkey